First Media may refer to:

 First Media (Indonesian media company)
 Digital First Media, an American newspaper publisher

See also
 First Look Media, an American non-profit media organization
 First Meditation
 First Nations Media Australia